The 1947 Florida Gators football team was an American football team that represented the University of Florida in the Southeastern Conference (SEC) during the 1947 college football season. The season was Raymond Wolf's second as the head coach of the Florida Gators football team. Wolf's 1947 Florida Gators finished with a 4–5–1 overall record and a 0–3–1 record in the SEC, placing last among 12 SEC teams.

On October 18, 1947, the Gators broke a 13-game post-war losing streak, dating back to the final game of the 1945 season, when they upset the 18th-ranked NC State Wolfpack, 7–6, on the Wolfpack's home field in Raleigh, North Carolina. Among the other highlights of the season, the Gators beat the in-state rival Miami Hurricanes in Miami, and ended the season with a 25–7 intersectional victory over the Kansas State Wildcats.

Florida halfback Bobby Forbes was selected by the Associated Press as a second-team player on the 1947 All-SEC football team.

Schedule

References

Florida
Florida Gators football seasons
Florida Gators football